The epithet "the Good" may refer to:

Alexander I of Moldavia (died 1432), Voivode (Prince) of Moldavia
Charles the Good (1083–1127), Count of Flanders and Danish Roman Catholic saint best known for being murdered while praying in a church
Haakon the Good (c. 920–961), King of Norway
Henry VI the Good (1294–1335), Duke of Wrocław
Hywel Dda (c. 880–948), king of most of Wales
Jan II the Good (c. 1460–1532), Duke of Opole-Brzeg and ruler of various other regions
John I of Portugal (1358–1433), King of Portugal and the Algarve
John II of France (1319–1364), King of France
María Díaz I de Haro (1270–1342), Spanish noblewoman
Emperor Meiji (1852-1912), Emperor of Japan
Philip the Good (1396–1467), Duke of Burgundy
Sigeberht the Good (died before 664), King of the East Saxons
Wenceslaus I, Duke of Bohemia (911–935 or possibly 929), also known as Václav the Good, subject of the Christmas carol "Good King Wenceslas"

See also
List of people known as the Bad
List of people known as the Evil

Lists of people by epithet